Thai Maaman is a 1994 Indian Tamil-language political satire film directed by Guru Dhanapal, starring Sathyaraj and Meena. It was released on 16 September 1994.

Plot 
Rasappan is a wealthy but irresponsible landlord in a village, who loves his niece Meena, an educated girl. Their parents decide to engage them, but Meena refuses to marry as Rasappan is jobless. Rasappan challenges them to find a decent job. Rasappan's uncle advises him to become a MLA. Rasappan joins Paramasivan's political party and contests in MLA election against his uncle Velusamy. Paramasivan is cruel-natured and decides to loot public money if Rasappan wins in his party. But Rasappan feels bad contesting against his own uncle and campaigns electors to vote for Velusamy instead of him. But, in an unexpected event, Rasappan wins the election. Rasappan becomes an honest MLA and helps his village people. He convinces the villagers to deposit their money in a new bank, which is promoted by Paramasivan's relative. Paramasivan and his relative loot all the deposited money and escape, which lands Rasappan in trouble. Rasappan is immediately sent to jail. Villagers burn Rasappan's house and steal his properties. Velusamy bails him out, Rasappan retrieves the money, gives it back to the villagers, and then sends Paramasivan and his partner to jail. Then Rasappan goes to Chennai to resign as MLA, but the Chief Minister congratulates Rasappan for his honesty and promotes him as the new minister for Home and Police. Back in his village, Paramasivan's henchmen attempt to kill him, but they fail. Meena agrees to get married to Rasappan.

Cast 
Sathyaraj as Rasappan
Meena as Meena
Goundamani as Rasappan's uncle
Vijayakumar as Velusamy, Meena's father
Manivannan as Paramasivan
Vadivukarasi as Rasappan's mother
Thalapathi Dinesh as alcohol warehouse's proprietor
Senthil
Ponnambalam
Vichu Viswanath
M. N. Nambiar as Arivudai Nambi, Chief Minister of Tamil Nadu.
Manobala in a guest appearance
Seetha as Rasappan sister

Soundtrack 
Soundtrack was composed by Deva and lyrics were written by Vairamuthu and Kalidasan.

Release and reception 
Thai Maaman was released on 16 September 1994. Malini Mannath wrote in The Indian Express, "[Thai Maaman] has turned out to be an engrossing entertainer that keeps you in splits for most of the time and thoughtful and ruminating for the rest." Thulasi of Kalki felt Meena was underutilised, but appreciated the film's fast pace while also appreciating cinematography in song "Amman Kovil" and editing but panned the film for too many messages.

References

External links 
 

1990s political satire films
1990s Tamil-language films
1994 films
Films directed by Guru Dhanapal
Films scored by Deva (composer)
Indian political satire films